The 2009 ISSF World Cup Final in rifle and pistol events was scheduled to be held 26–28 October 2009 in Wuxi, China, as the conclusion of the 2009 World Cup season. It will be the first time the final is held in China.

There are ten spots in each of the ten events. The defending champion from the 2008 World Cup Final and the reigning Olympic champions qualify automatically. The remaining eight qualify through a special point-awarding system based on their best performance during the World Cup season, skipping past automatic qualifiers. Not counting the defending and Olympic champions, there will be a maximum of two shooters per event from the same country.

The qualification system awards a win with 15 points, a silver medal with 10, a bronze medal with 8, a fourth place with 5, a fifth with 4, a sixth with 3, a seventh with 2 and an eighth place with 1 point. It also gives out points for qualification scores within a certain range from the current world record: from 1 point for fourteen points off the record, to 15 points for equalling or raising it.

Schedule 
All times are local (UTC+8).

Men's 50 metre rifle three positions

Qualified shooters

Men's 50 metre rifle prone

Qualified shooters

Men's 10 metre air rifle

Qualified shooters

Men's 50 metre pistol

Qualified shooters

Men's 25 metre rapid fire pistol

Qualified shooters

Men's 10 metre air pistol

Qualified shooters

Women's 50 metre rifle three positions

Qualified shooters

Women's 10 metre air rifle

Qualified shooters

Women's 25 metre pistol

Qualified shooters

Women's 10 metre air pistol

Qualified shooters

External links 
 Qualification standings at the ISSF website

ISSF World Cup
World Cup Final